Kim Yo-han (born September 22, 1999), also known by the mononym Yohan, is a South Korean singer and actor. He is a member of the boy group WEi and a former member of boy group X1, finishing first on Produce X 101. He made his solo debut with the digital single "No More" on August 25, 2020. He debuted in acting through A Love So Beautiful.

Early life
Kim was born on September 22, 1999, in Jungnang District, Seoul, South Korea. He has two younger sisters. Prior to his debut, Kim was a national taekwondo athlete. He was a two-time champion at the National Youth Sports Festival.

Career

2019: Produce X 101 and X1
In May 2019, Kim participated in the Mnet reality-survival program Produce X 101 despite having only three months of training. The original intention of the show was for the eleven winners of the program to form a boy group that would promote for 5 years under Swing Entertainment. Kim finished first in the competition, and debuted as a member and center of X1 on August 27, 2019, with its debut showcase held at Gocheok Sky Dome. However, X1 would later disband on January 6, 2020, due to allegations of vote-rigging in the show. On November 5, 2019, Ahn Joon-young, the producer of Produce X 101, was arrested, and he later admitted to manipulating the vote rankings.

2020: Solo career and debut with WEi
Kim was in the talks to join the School series, School 2020. It was later confirmed in February 2020, with the show slated to air in August 2020. In April 2020, it was reported that the series had been cancelled by KBS due to casting controversy over the female lead role.

On June 17, 2020, Oui Entertainment announced that they will be debuting a new boy group, tentatively called "OUIBOYZ", in the second half of the year. Kim is expected to be a part of this group, alongside label mates Kim Dong-han, Jang Dae-hyeon, and Kang Seok-hwa.

On July 10, 2020, Oui Entertainment launched social media accounts for their new boy group called "WEi" which Kim has been confirmed to be a member of. They also released an image film for the logo.

Kim was also announced as an MC for the first day of the 26th Dream Concert "CONNECT:D".

On August 6, 2020, it was announced that Kim would be releasing a solo song, in the form of a digital single, on August 25, 2020, ahead of his future debut with WEi, titled "No More", produced by Zion. T.

On October 5, 2020, Kim debuted with WEi with the mini album Identity: First Sight, with the title track "Twilight".

He also starred as the main lead in the K-drama "A Love So Beautiful", which is the remake of the C-drama of the same name, marking his acting debut. He also contributed to the OST by making a soundtrack appearance in "Recently", which was released on January 11, 2021.

2021–present: Solo activities
On March 2, 2021, Kim became one of the hosts for SBS MTV's music program "The Show" alongside Ateez's Yeosang and Weeekly's Jihan.

In 2021, Kim joins the cast of variety show Chick High Kick  along with HaHa and Na Tae-joo. Later, Kim will be confirmed to join the KBS drama School 2021 with  Jo Yi-hyun.

On January 10, 2022, Kim released his first solo mini album Illusion, with the title track "Dessert".

In February of 2022, Vanity Teen editor Aedan Juvet revealed Kim's debut magazine cover, making him the magazine's first K-pop artist to receive a digital cover feature.

In February 2023, Kim is scheduled to release "Let's Love" with Chuu, which is part of Project Restless and will be released on February 23.

Discography

Extended plays

Singles

As lead artist

Promotional singles

Soundtrack appearances

Songwriting
All song credits are adapted from the Korea Music Copyright Association's database, unless otherwise noted.

Filmography

Television series

Web series

Television shows

Web shows

Radio shows

Awards and nominations

Notes

References

External links

 
 
 

1999 births
People from Seoul
Living people
WEi members
Swing Entertainment artists
South Korean male idols
South Korean male pop singers
South Korean male taekwondo practitioners
South Korean male television actors
South Korean male web series actors
Produce 101 contestants
21st-century South Korean male singers
21st-century South Korean male actors
Reality show winners